Contract with Death  is a 1998 Russian/Belarusian  crime drama film directed by Dmitry Astrakhan.

Plot 
The film tells about the politicians who create the charity fund, which in fact is a concern for the use of weak people for organ transplantation.

Cast 
 Andrey Myagkov as Professor Ignatovski
 Dmitry Pevtsov as Stepanov
 Anna Legchilova as Lena   
 Yuri Pristrom as Anton
 Olga Sutulova as Anya
 Oleg Fomin as Gena Shnyr
 Yevgeni Pimenov as Volodya
 Sergey Stepanchenko as Sergey

References

External links 
 

1998 films
1990s Russian-language films
Russian crime drama films
Russian thriller films
1998 drama films
Films directed by Dmitry Astrakhan
Belarusfilm films
Belarusian drama films
1990s psychological thriller films